Bárbara Sánchez may be:
Bárbara Sánchez (Ecuadorian footballer), born 1987
Bárbara Sánchez (Venezuelan footballer), born 1990
Bárbara Sánchez-Kane, Mexican fashion designer
Bárbara Rebolledo Sánchez, Chilean television presenter